The eusko is a local currency released by the "Eusko Moneta erakundea", and it is one of a number of currencies that are active in the Basque Country. It is mainly used in the Northern Basque Country, France. The currency was created on the 31st of January 2013.

Features 
The smallest value of the eusko is the one eusko format, so it can not be separated in less than that amount. The eusko has a value that is equal to the euro, so the price of an article can be totally paid in euskos, but if the article doesn't have a round price, the difference will be paid in cents. (Example: if an article costs 3,50 euros, it can be paid with 3 euskos and 50 euro cents)

Its motto is "Euskoa denen esku", which means "The eusko in the hands of everyone".

Format 
The eusko has a note based format that enables the user to trade with values that go from the one eusko note to the twenty eusko note.
The appearance of the notes varies according to the value of the note:
The one eusko note is blue, and has an image of a txalaparta on it
The two eusko note is red, and has a scene of a folk dance on it
The five eusko note is grey, and has a countryside scene on it
The ten eusko note is yellow, and has an image of a blackboard with the Basque verbs form "Nor-Nori-Nork"
The twenty eusko note is purple, and has an image of an industrial port that shows some cranes

Several security systems protect the notes from forgery, similar to the ones euro has. Those include:
A complex filigree
A heated gold mark
Off set marks for blind people to identify note value

Aims 
The aim of the eusko is to encourage the community to buy from local traders. This potentially strengthens the local economy and reduce ecological damage caused by long supply chains. Additionally, it aims to promote solidarity.

History

Predecessors 
The idea of the eusko starts when the AMBES (from French Association pour la création d’une Monnaie locale Basque, Ecologique et Solidaire) took the example of another currency that was running in France, and thought that could be profitable and applicable to the Basque country.
The choice of the name came up when the AMBES asked citizens to choose a name for their optimal currency.

Getting started 
The eusko gave its first steps the 31st of January 2013, with the initial number of 126,500 eusko copies. From the very beginning the eusko was accepted in all the establishments that were associated. 
According to the creators of the eusko, 310 businesses and enterprises accept the eusko as a form of paying, and the eusko has spread to more than 1500 users.
The AMBES said that eusko would have a credit card system in 2015.

See also

 Alternative currency
 Fiscal localism
 Local purchasing

References 

PAYS BASQUE. Monnaie locale : l’eusko, éthique et utile

 Le Pays basque lance sa propre monnaie
 L’eusko, la monnaie basque première monnaie locale de France

External links 
 Official site: Accueil

 
Basque
Currencies introduced in 2013
2013 establishments in Europe
Currencies of Europe